Lyons Creek or Lyon Creek may refer to:

Waterways
Lyons Creek (Antarctica)
Lyon Creek (Kansas)
Lyons Creek (Maryland), United States
Lyons Creek (Ontario), Canada

Other
Lyons Creek Middle School, Coconut Creek, Florida, United States